The Haunting Of is an American documentary television series that premiered on October 27, 2012. The series aired its first two seasons on The Biography Channel prior to moving to Lifetime Movie Network beginning with its third. Hosted by Kim Russo, The Haunting Of... tells the stories of various celebrities who have agreed to tell their first-hand details of when the paranormal changed their lives forever. It is a spinoff of Celebrity Ghost Stories.

Episodes

Season 1 (2012)

Season 2 (2013)

Season 3 (2013)

Season 4 (2014)

Season 5 (2015)

Season 6 (2016)

Specials

References

2010s American documentary television series
2012 American television series debuts
English-language television shows
Paranormal reality television series